WSNG (610 AM) is a radio station licensed in Torrington, Connecticut, broadcasting a talk radio format.  WSNG is simulcasting 1360 WDRC (AM), Hartford.  The stations use the slogan "The Talk of Connecticut" featuring Mornings with Gary Byron and syndicated programs the rest of the day, including Michael Savage. The station is owned by Red Wolf Broadcasting and features programming from Fox News Radio, Salem Radio Network, and Westwood One.  The Talk of Connecticut stations also broadcast sporting events such as New York Yankees major league baseball, New Britain Rock Cats minor league baseball, Hartford Hawks college basketball and high school sports.

History
WSNG was originally signed on in the late 1940s as WTOR which transmitted from 93 Perkins Street with 250 watts on 1490kc. It moved the transmitter to Harwinton in 1964 (WBZY was forced to shut down) after being granted 1 kW day 500w night with a three-tower directional array on 610 kc (most likely due to WGCH in Greenwich, CT launching later that same year). It was then owned by Edmund Willian Waller.  The callsign change came after the station was acquired by new owners at a date later than 1966.

The format at WSNG was full service radio throughout the 1970s and '80s.  Many popular personalities worked at WSNG including "Captain" Jay Sheldon, Dan Lovallo and news anchor Jeff Zeiner.  During the mid-1980s these personalities left and the format shifted to "consumer" radio.  That format proved unpopular and an abortive attempt of returning to full service radio failed.  New competition from WZBG caused the station to go dark in the 1990s.

Buckley Broadcasting purchased the station before it would have permanently lost its license.  It now simulcasts WDRC as part of the Talk of Connecticut network.

On March 5, 2014, Buckley Broadcasting announced that it would sell its Connecticut radio stations, including WSNG, to Connoisseur Media. The sale was consummated on July 7, 2014, at a price of $7,922,035. Connoisseur sold WSNG, along with the other Talk of Connecticut stations (except for WWCO in Waterbury), WDRC-FM in Hartford, and W272DO in New Haven, to Red Wolf Broadcasting for $8 million in January 2018; the sale was completed on March 29, 2018.

References

External links
WSNG official website

SNG
Talk radio stations in the United States
Radio stations established in 1948
1948 establishments in Connecticut
News and talk radio stations in the United States